Yeshivat Eretz Hatzvi is a Modern Orthodox yeshiva, located in the  Givat Mordechai neighborhood of Jerusalem on the Jerusalem College of Technology Campus, Israel. It was founded in 2004.

Rabbi David Ebner and Rabbi Yehuda Susman serve as the Rashei Yeshiva. Rav Ebner also serves as the Yeshiva's Mashgiach ruchani. The executive staff further consists of the Mankal (Director) of the Yeshiva Rav Benny Pflanzer, the SaMankal (Deputy Director) Rabbi Todd Berman and the associate director Rabbi Yitz Motzen. The Yeshiva's administrator is Mrs. Shulamith T. Ebner.

Students

The student body is made up of students from all around the world. The yeshiva currently has students from America, Canada, England, Australia and South Africa. The yeshiva also has a high percentage of students from different European countries.

Sedarim
Morning Seder

The student body is divided into a number of different shiurim (class-levels), based on level of proficiency. Each shiur has its own "Ram" (Rabbi). Additionally, Rabbi Simcha Krauss gives a shiur to the higher levels brought together once a week.  Classes meet for one hour in the morning, followed by an hour and a half of group study to familiarize students with the sources, followed by another hour Shiur where the Ram goes over the sources in depth.

Afternoon Seder

Afternoon seder has its own set of "Ramim" (Rabbis). There are separate sets of Rabbis for Halacha, Tanakh and Machshava classes, although some of the Rabbis teach in multiple sedarim.  Afternoon seder is split into two shiurim by a fifteen-minute break.  The two shiurim are selected from a number of options during a shopping period at the beginning of each semester.

Night Seder and Kollel

Part of night seder includes learning with an Israeli chavruta.  Students are encouraged to spend the rest of night seder pursuing independent projects in Jewish study by themselves or with other students.  The Israelis are members of a kollel who live and learn in Eretz HaTzvi, although they attend university during the day.

Yeshiva Traditions
Every spring, the school holds a week-long competition between the different shiurim in honor of Purim.

It is tradition for every student to give a brief talk to the entire student body once during the year.  These talks are given twice a week, in the morning, so that each student should get a chance to speak at some point during the year.

References

External links
Yeshivat Eretz Hatzvi
 Divrei Torah by Yeshiva Rabbis as featured on YUTorah Online
Yeshiva University Guide to Israel Schools

Educational institutions established in 2004
Eretz HaTzvi
Eretz HaTzvi
2004 establishments in Israel